This list of history journals presents representative notable academic journals pertaining to the field of history and historiography. It includes scholarly journals listed by journal databases and professional associations such as: JSTOR, Project MUSE, the Organization of American Historians,  the American Historical Association, Goedeken (2000), or are published by national or regional historical societies, or by major scholarly publishers (such as Cambridge University Press, Oxford University Press,  the University of Chicago Press and Taylor & Francis). It does not include many of the world's 5000 journals devoted to local history or highly specialized topics. This list is a compilation and not one based on an exhaustive examination and judgment of quality.

General history
 The American Historical Review
 Annales. Histoire, Sciences sociales
 Canadian Journal of History/Annales canadiennes d'histoire
 The English Historical Review
 The Historian
 The Historical Journal
 Historische Zeitschrift
 History
 History Compass
 History Today
 History Workshop Journal
 Journal of Interdisciplinary History
 Past & Present
 Radical History Review
 Revue historique
 Rivista Storica Italiana

By period

Classical
 Antiguo Oriente
 Bryn Mawr Classical Review
 Historia: Zeitschrift für Alte Geschichte – Revue d'Histoire Ancienne – Journal of Ancient History – Rivista di Storia Antica
 The Journal of Hellenic Studies

Modern and contemporary
 Eighteenth-Century Studies
 The Historical Journal
 Journal of Contemporary History
 The Journal of Modern History

Comparative and world
 Comparative Studies in Society and History
 Journal of World History

By region

Africa
 African Archaeological Review
 African Economic History
 African Historical Review
 Afrique & Histoire
 History in Africa
 International Journal of African Historical Studies
 The Journal of African History
 Journal of Modern African Studies
 Journal of Southern African Studies
 Rhodesiana
 South African Historical Journal
 Zaïre. Revue Congolaise—Congoleesch Tijdschrift

Egypt
 Journal of the American Research Center in Egypt
 Studien zur Altägyptischen Kultur

Asia
 Asian Survey
 Central Asian Survey
 Iranian Studies
 Journal of American-East Asian Relations
 Journal of the American Oriental Society
 The Journal of Asian Studies
 Journal of the Royal Asiatic Society
 Modern Asian Studies

East Asia
 Bulletin of the National Museum of Japanese History
 Central Asian Survey
 Chinese Historical Review
 Early and Medieval Chinese History
 Journal of Japanese Studies
 Korean Studies
 Late Imperial China
 Monumenta Nipponica
 Social Science Japan Journal
 T'oung Pao: International Journal of Chinese Studies

South Asia
 Indian Economic and Social History Review
 Indian Historical Review

Southeast Asia
 Brunei Museum Journal
 Journal of the Malaysian Branch of the Royal Asiatic Society
 Journal of Southeast Asian Studies
 SOAS Bulletin of Burma Research
 Journal of the Siam Society

Australasia and Oceania
 Aboriginal History
 Australian Economic History Review
 Australian Historical Studies
 Australian Journal of Politics and History
 Journal of the Royal Australian Historical Society
 New Zealand Journal of History
 Oceania
 Queensland History Journal
 Victorian Historical Journal

Europe
 Contemporary European History
 European History Quarterly
 European Review of History: Revue européenne d'histoire
 Historical Social Research
 Itinerario

Middle Ages
 Bibliothèque de l'École des Chartes
 Early Medieval Europe
 Journal of Medieval History
 Reti Medievali Rivista
 The Medieval Review
 Speculum: A Journal of Medieval Studies

Britain
 Albion
 Anglo-Saxon England
 Arthuriana
 British Catholic History
 The British Journal for the History of Science
 Britain and the World, formerly British Scholar
 Cambrian Medieval Celtic Studies
 Contemporary British History
 The Economic History Review
 The English Historical Review
 History Workshop Journal
 History: The Journal of the Historical Association
 Journal of British Studies
 Journal of Scottish Historical Studies, formerly Scottish Economic and Social History
 Journal of Victorian Culture
 Past and Present
 The Scottish Historical Review
 Twentieth Century British History
 Victorian Studies

Regional or local
 Oxoniensia

Ireland
 Analecta Hibernica
 Archivium Hibernicum
 Clogher Record
 Collectanea Hibernica
 Dublin Historical Record
 Eighteenth-Century Ireland
 Ériu
 The Irish Sword, formerly Journal of the Military History Society of Ireland
 Journal of the Galway Archaeological and Historical Society
 Journal of the Royal Society of Antiquaries of Ireland
 Studia Hibernica

Eastern Europe and Balkans

 Central Asian Survey
 Contemporary European History
 Harvard Ukrainian Studies
 Journal of Baltic Studies
 Journal of Modern Greek Studies
 Journal of Slavic Military Studies
 Kritika: Explorations in Russian and Eurasian History
 Kwartalnik Historyczny
 Prispevki za novejšo zgodovino
 Revolutionary Russia
 Russian History
 Slavic Review
 Slavonic and East European Review
 Soviet Studies
 The Polish Review
 The Russian Review
 The Slavic and East European Journal
 Politics, Religion & Ideology (formerly Totalitarian Movements and Political Religions)
 Zgodovinski časopis

Nordic Europe
 Historisk Tidskrift (Sweden)
 Historisk Tidskrift för Finland
 Historisk Tidsskrift (Denmark)
 Historisk Tidsskrift (Norway)
 Saga (Iceland)
 Nordic Historical Review
 Scandinavian Journal of History

Western Europe
 BMGN: Low Countries Historical Review
 Bulletin for Spanish and Portuguese Historical Studies
 Central European History
 Dutch Crossing: Journal of Low Countries Studies
 French Historical Studies
 French History
 French Studies
 German History
 German Studies Review
 Historische Zeitschrift
 Journal of Belgian History

Latin America and the Caribbean
 Anuario Colombiano de Historia Social y de la Cultura
 Boletín americanista
 Revista de Historia Americana y Argentina
 Hispanic American Historical Review
 Historia
 Journal of Latin American Studies
 Mexican Studies/Estudios Mexicanos
 Revista Complutense de Historia de América

Middle East
 Arabic Sciences and Philosophy
 Bulletin of the American Schools of Oriental Research
 Iranian Studies Journal
 Jerusalem Quarterly
 Journal of Near Eastern Studies
 Journal of Palestine Studies
 Palestine Exploration Quarterly

United States
 The American Genealogist
 American Quarterly
 Arkansas Historical Quarterly
 Atlanta History: A Journal of Georgia and the South
 California History
 The Chronicles of Oklahoma
 Civil War History
 Florida Historical Quarterly
 Georgia Historical Quarterly
 Indiana Magazine of History
 The Journal of American History (formerly Mississippi Valley Historical Review)
 Journal of American Studies
 Journal of the Early Republic
 Journal of the Gilded Age and Progressive Era
 Journal of Illinois History
 Journal of Southern History
 Journal of the Southwest
 Journal of the West
 The Kansas Historical Quarterly
 Michigan Historical Review
 Minnesota History
 Missouri Historical Review
 Montana: The Magazine of Western History
 The New England Quarterly
 Ohio History
 Oregon Historical Quarterly
 Pacific Historical Review
 Pacific Northwest Quarterly
 Pennsylvania History: A Journal of Mid-Atlantic Studies
 Pennsylvania Magazine of History and Biography
 Reviews in American History
 William and Mary Quarterly, pre-1815
 Southwestern Historical Quarterly
 Virginia Magazine of History and Biography
 Western Historical Quarterly
 Wisconsin Magazine of History

Canada
 Acadiensis
 Canada's History, formerly The Beaver (1920 – 2010)
 Canadian Historical Review
 Saskatchewan History

By topic

Archives
 American Archivist
 Archivaria
 Archives

Business, labor and economics
 African Economic History
 Agricultural History
 Agricultural History Review
 American Communist History
 Business History
 Business History Review
 Communisme
 Economic History Review
 Enterprise and Society
 Essays in Economic & Business History
 European Review of Economic History
 Financial History Review
 International Labor and Working Class History
 Journal of Economic History
 Labor History
 Labor: Studies in Working-Class History
 Labour/Le Travail
 Twentieth Century Communism

Demography and family
 Continuity and Change: A Journal of Social Structure, Law and Demography in Past Societies
 Journal of Family History
 Journal of the History of Childhood and Youth

Ethnic and racial studies
 Amerasia Journal
 American Jewish History
 Australian Journal of Jewish Studies
 Jewish Social Studies
 Journal of African American History, formerly The Journal of Negro History (1916–2001)
 Journal of Asian American Studies

Food History
 Petits Propos Culinaires
 Food & History

Genocide
 Holocaust and Genocide Studies
 Holocaust Studies: A Journal of Culture and History
 Journal of Genocide Research

Ideas and historiography

 History and Theory
 History of European Ideas
 Journal of the History of Ideas
 Social Science History

International relations and diplomatic
 Diplomatic History
 Journal of American-East Asian Relations
 Cold War History
 Journal of Cold War Studies
 Journal of Conflict Resolution
 Journal of Peace Research
 Prague Papers on the History of International Relations

Legal
 American Journal of Legal History
 Revista Chilena de Historia del Derecho

Maritime
 American Neptune
 International Journal of Maritime History
 Mariner's Mirror
 Northern Mariner

Media and books
 American Literary History
 Book History
 Film & History
 The Historical Journal of Film, Radio and Television
 Huntington Library Quarterly

Military
 Journal of Military History
 The Journal of Slavic Military Studies
 Militärgeschichtliche Zeitschrift
 Journal for the Society of Army Historical Research
 War in History
 War & Society

Politics and public policy
 American Communist History
 The Journal of Legislative Studies
 Journal of Policy History
 Presidential Studies Quarterly
 The Public Historian

Religion
 American Jewish History
 Anglican & Episcopal History
 Anuario de Historia de la Iglesia
 Australian Journal of Jewish Studies
 British Catholic History
 The Catholic Historical Review
 Church History
 History of Religions
 John Whitmer Historical Association Journal
 Journal of Ecclesiastical History
 Journal of Mormon History
 Journal of Religious History
 The Mennonite Quarterly Review
 Mormon Historical Studies
 Numen
 Revue d'Histoire Ecclésiastique
 Reformation

Science and technology
 Ambix
 Annals of Science
 The British Journal for the History of Science
 Bulletin of the History of Medicine
 Centaurus
 Historical Studies in the Natural Sciences
 History and Technology
 IEEE Annals of the History of Computing
 Isis
 Journal for the History of Astronomy
 Journal of the History of Medicine and Allied Sciences
 Notes and Records of the Royal Society
 Osiris
 Quest: The History of Spaceflight
  The Rutherford Journal
 Technology and Culture

Social
 Historical Social Research
 History of Intellectual Culture
 History Workshop Journal
 Journal of Social History
 Social Science History

Teaching and methods
 The History Teacher
 American Educational History Journal
 Programming Historian

Urban
 Journal of Planning History
 Journal of Urban History
 Urban History

Women and gender studies
 Australian Feminist Studies
 Aspasia
 Feminist Studies
 Gender & History
 Journal of the History of Sexuality
 Journal of Women's History

See also
 List of historians
 History journal
 Historiography
 List of historical societies, most of which have journals or popular magazines
 List of scientific journals

References

Further reading
 Dalton, Margaret Stieg, and Laurie Charnigo. "Historians and their information sources." College & Research Libraries  (2004) 65#5 pp. 400–425. online
 Henson, Kenneth T. "Writing for professional journals." Phi Delta Kappan 80.10 (1999): 780+.  online
 Hérubel, Jean-Pierre VM. "Acknowledging Clio's lesser children: The importance of journals for historical research and scholarship." Journal of Scholarly Publishing (2008) 39#3 pp: 241–256.
 Hérubel, Jean-Pierre VM. "The nature of three history journals: A citation experiment." Collection Management 12.34 (1990): 57–67.
 Hérubel, Jean-Pierre VM, and Edward A. Goedeken. "Trends in historical scholarship as evidenced in the American Historical Review: 1896–1990." Serials Review (1993) 19#2 pp: 79–84.
 Kitchens, Joel D. "Clio on the Web: An Annotated Bibliography of Select E-Journals for History" Perspectives on History (Feb 2000) online
 Lingelbach, Gabriele. "The Institutionalization and Professionalization of History in Europe and the United States." in The Oxford History of Historical Writing: Volume 4: 1800–1945 4 (2011): 78+ online
 Stankus, Tony, and Edward A. Goedeken. "Journals of the Century in Modern History" in Journals of the Century (Haworth Press, 2002) excerpt
 Stieg, Margaret F. The origin and development of scholarly historical periodicals (University Alabama Press, 1986)

External links
 Full text of 300 history journals at JSTOR
 Full text of journals at Project MUSE

Journals
Historiography
History